The Basketball Bundesliga Most Effective Player Awards are annual awards that are given to the best player in a given Basketball Bundesliga (BBL) season, based on statistics. The awards were handed out for the first time in the 2015–16 season. Two awards are given, one for the most effective German player in the league, and one for the most effective international (non-German) player in the league.

The winner of the award is determined by the Efficiency formula:
(PTS + REB + AST + STL + BLK − Missed FG − Missed FT − TO) / GP

Key

International winners

German winners

References

External links
German League official website 

Most Effective Player